Kalliopi Ouzouni (born February 8, 1973, in Thessaloniki) is a retired female shot putter from Greece. Her personal best throw is 18.90 metres, achieved in May 2004 in Kalamata. This places her second on the Greek all-time list, behind Irini Terzoglou. She holds the indoor national record with 19.03 m, achieved in January 2000 in Piraeus.

She finished seventh at the 2000 Olympic Games and twelfth at the 2002 European Championships. She also competed at the 1999 and 2001 World Championships as well as the 2004 Olympic Games without reaching the finals.  She won the women's event with 18.63m,, which earned her a spot on the European Cup team.

Competition record

1No mark in the final

References

1973 births
Living people
Greek female shot putters
Athletes (track and field) at the 2000 Summer Olympics
Athletes (track and field) at the 2004 Summer Olympics
Olympic athletes of Greece
Athletes from Thessaloniki
20th-century Greek women
21st-century Greek women